Midland is a census-designated place (CDP) in Fauquier County, Virginia, United States. The population as of the 2010 census was 218. Midland is home to a post office with the local ZIP code of 22728.

Midland is the closest community to the birthplace of John Marshall, the longest-serving Chief Justice in U.S. Supreme Court history. A small park honors his birthplace, with a marker placed where his home once stood. The county is also designated as part of the John Marshall Soil and Water Conservation District.

Geography
Midland is in southern Fauquier County along State Route 28, northeast of Bealeton and southwest of Calverton.

The Warrenton–Fauquier Airport is situated in Midland. Ross Industries is a company that has its headquarters in Midland.

C. M. Crockett Park is located just north of Midland. It has Germantown Lake and the archeological sites of Germantown.  The park has many facilities available to the public and is often used for county-wide events.

References

Census-designated places in Fauquier County, Virginia